"Bend & Break" is the fifth episode of the eleventh season of the American television medical drama Grey's Anatomy, and is the 225th episode overall. It aired on October 23, 2014, on ABC in the United States. The episode was written by Meg Marinis and directed by Jesse Bochco. On its initial airing, it was watched by 8.62 million viewers and received highly positive reviews from critics, with major praise directed towards Ramirez and Capshaw's performances. In the episode, Callie Torres (Sara Ramirez) and Arizona Robbins (Jessica Capshaw) deep-dive into the problems that have contributed to their troubled marriage. At work, Callie immerses herself in the Veterans' project with Owen Hunt (Kevin McKidd) and spends more time with Meredith Grey (Ellen Pompeo), and Arizona struggles to impress Dr. Nicole Herman (Geena Davis).

Plot
In their therapist's office, Callie says they've been talking about having another baby for months and they were excited. Arizona says that she never said that she doesn't want another baby and Arizona is mad the Callie started dating Derek Shephered Meridith is not happy and dates Arizona  of a lifetime. She thought she'd never get an opportunity like that. Callie says she took it and she went, but Arizona reminds her that she came back for Callie and when she came back, Callie was pregnant. The therapist says they're not getting anywhere. They've circled right back to where they started. It's time to hit the reset button. Callie says she doesn't like it, but Arizona says she thinks they should do it.

Callie is in a conference room with Owen and Jackson saying their idea is the stupidest thing she's ever heard. They're talking about using a portion of her grant money to pay for a multi-step facial reconstruction for just one patient. Jackson says he's going to get lunch and Owen should find him later. After he leaves, Owen sits down and asks Callie what's going on.

Arizona and Callie make a schedule for childcare and decide to stick to it. Callie gathers her clothes, toothbrush, hairbrush, and toothpaste. No talking. No communication except for emergencies Callie and Arizona look at each other from their respective rooms. Lastly, no intimacy. No sex with each other or other people. By the end of day 1 Callie finds April and Arizona in the kitchen cooking. April asks if they're too loud for Sofia. Callie says they aren't, but she thought that Arizona needed to study. April explains that they're making jello moms for her to practice on. Dawson asks Callie what she did as we see her walk into her bedroom with the bottle of wine and shut the door. Callie says she followed the rules, but the rules suck.

On day 10, Arizona is re-positioning a fetus for surgery after which, Herman tells Arizona she'll take the lead on the next one, so she needs to be ready as Arizona celebrates. Emily a patient of Callie is back in the ER in extreme pain. Callie does an ultrasound of her upper arm and says a little over a week post-op, it's still going to hurt from time to time, but she says she can't eat or sleep. The pain comes in shocks 2-3 times a minute. Callie says she's run every test and nothing is coming up. Emily says she can't live like this and begs Callie to do something. Callie goes into a supply room, shuts the door, and knocks some supplies off a shelf. Meredith peeks out from behind a shelf and is shocked. Meredith asks if she's okay as she says she's obviously not. Callie says she has no one to talk to.

Meredith and Callie are sitting at the bar doing shots. Callie explains what she's doing with Arizona. Meredith says it's exactly what she's doing with Derek, only healthy. They make fun of their spouses. Callie wonders if Sofia will be a legacy cheater because both of the people she's been married to have cheated on her. Meredith says Cristina was the third rail in her marriage. She asks if it's possible that her own true love in life was a girl. They sing about vaginas. Callie says it's a pretty word and people should say it more. Then she says she misses sex. They do another shot together.

On day 29 Back in their bedroom, Callie tosses Arizona back on the bed and crawls on top of her. Arizona says that tomorrow's the last day. Callie says they're close enough then. Arizona asks what if Dawson makes them start over. Callie says they just won't tell her and they continue to have sex.

On day 30 Callie and Arizona are in the therapist's office. Arizona talks about how the 30-day period made her realize that while they still have a long way to go, she realizes she truly loves Callie. While the world around her is no longer making sense, including her professional life, she realizes she needs Callie as her anchor, one good thing in her life. Callie is sobbing as it's now her turn to talk. She was against the 30-day break at first, but looking back on that period, she has laughed and done and enjoyed herself more than she's done in a long time. She finally feels free, which made her see that trying to fix her relationship with Arizona all the time is what's been killing her slowly. They should both love themselves and Sofia, rather than each other now. While Callie's voice over says that some things can't be fixed, Callie says she wants Arizona to feel free too. She packs her stuff as Arizona remains speechless, and leaves the therapist's office.

Reception

Broadcast
The episode aired on October 23, 2014, on American Broadcasting Company (ABC) in the United States. On its initial release the episode was watched by 8.62 million viewers and garnered a 2.5/8 Nielsen ratings and ranked no. 16 in 18-49 key demographic and was the 4th most watched drama.

Reviews

The episode received highly positive reviews with critics praising the chemistry between Sara Ramirez and Ellen Pompeo's characters, as well as Ramirez and Capshaw's performances. 

Entertainment Weekly called Callie and singing, "a moment of beautiful, weird, comical bonding." "Fempop lauded the episode giving it a 4.9/5 score, "There's subtly and nuance in this episode that has been absent from the relationship it explores." adding, "This episode gets 5 stars because it brings really great drama, but mainly because of the vagina song. I love how every major Calzona episode features a brief musical number."

The Huffington Post gave a mostly positive review stating, "Watching Callie abd Meredith get drunk though? Entirely amusing. It makes sense that two people who need to not go home could put their misery to good use." Christina Tran of TV Fanatic gave a mixed review stating, "All in all, this installment just wasn't my cup of tea." but liked Ramirez and Pompeo's characters saying, "My favorite part of the entire installment was mainly when Callie hung with Meredith. It's easy to forget sometimes throwing back tequila shots and even cheeseburgers makes a terrible day nearly forgettable."

References

Grey's Anatomy (season 11) episodes
2014 American television episodes